Center Bridge Historic District is a national historic district located in Solebury Township, Bucks County, Pennsylvania.  The district includes 60 contributing buildings, 2 contributing sites, and 3 contributing structures in the village of Center Bridge.  Notable buildings are the William Mitchell / Edward R. Redfield House (1815, 1930s) and a unique row of two-family workers' dwellings.  Also located in the district is the separately listed Isaiah Paxson Farm.

It was added to the National Register of Historic Places in 1985.

Gallery

References

Historic districts in Bucks County, Pennsylvania
Historic districts on the National Register of Historic Places in Pennsylvania
National Register of Historic Places in Bucks County, Pennsylvania